The British Open Polo Championship for the Cowdray Gold Cup is an annual polo tournament held at Cowdray Park, West Sussex, England.

It is the premier polo tournament in Europe at High Goal (22 goal) level. 

The tournament is held at Cowdray Park Polo Club with matches being played at their Lawns Grounds and Ambersham Grounds over the course of a 3-week period. Culminating in the Gold Cup Final held at Lawns grounds in the shadows of the Cowdray Ruins.

History
The tournament was established in 1956 by 3rd Viscount Cowdray. Players have included members of the British royal family including Prince Philip, Duke of Edinburgh and King Charles III, Kerry Packer and his son James Packer.

It was formerly sponsored by champagne house Veuve Clicquot and watchmaker Jaeger-LeCoultre.

According to polo player Mark Tomlinson, it is "the most important tournament in the UK".

List of Champions

References

https://cowdraypolo.co.uk/gold-cup/
https://hurlinghampolo.com/past-winners-of-the-gold-cup
https://cowdraypolo.co.uk/news/gold-cup-final-2021/

Sport in West Sussex
Polo competitions in the United Kingdom
1956 establishments in England